Francis Elmer Cabalteja Magundayao (born May 14, 1999) is a Filipino actor and commercial model. He was first known as Iking in the series, Darna. He is also known for portraying young Travis (adult version portrayed by Gerald Anderson) in Sana Maulit Muli, Paco in the May Bukas Pa, Adrian in Aryana. He graduated high school from Far Eastern University-Diliman last June 7, 2019 with his mother, Frances Magundayao attending the commencement ceremony at the Philippine International Convention Center in Pasay.

Career
Francis Elmer Cabalteja Magundayao, cousin of Abelardo Pagulayan (Mr. Pogi 2018) started his career as a commercial model at a very young age. He appears in several commercial before joining the cast of Darna as the heroine's sidekick, from then on he was referred to as Iking. Francis is also oftentimes portray the younger version of Gerald Anderson's character in television series like Sana Maulit Muli, Tayong Dalawa and Tiagong Akyat. He has since landed short supporting roles in various GMA and ABS-CBN shows, but it was his role as the teen version of Piolo Pascual's character in the drama Dahil Sa Pag-ibig that made people notice him.

After his short stint as teen Alfred in Dahil sa Pag ibig, Francis topbilled his first ever Maalaala Mo Kaya episode with John Manalo about the friendship of two boys whose dreams turned into tragic experienced. The said MMK episode was the most-watched program last March 31, 2012.

2012–present: Star Magic
Francis signed an exclusive contract with Star Magic and got reunited with Ella Cruz when he became a part of Aryana. Francis was supposed to be in a film with Kathryn Bernardo and Daniel Padilla, but later give up his role to perform with his family in noontime variety show It's Showtime.

In August 2019, Francis was once again reunited with his Aryana co-star and loveteam Ella Cruz together with Bugoy Cariño as they topbill Wansapanataym's Oh My Genius. In October 2013, Francis was supposed to be reunited with Ella for the fifth time in the upcoming family drama You're My Home, with Richard Gomez and Dawn Zulueta, but the plans fell through and the drama was put on hold by Dreamscape to give way for the productions' other dramas.

In January 2014, at the ABS-CBN Trade Launch, it was revealed that Francis and his Aryana co-star Michelle Vito are part of the ensemble cast of Sana Bukas pa ang Kahapon, which starred Bea Alonzo, Paulo Avelino and Albert Martinez. In March, he again topbills another Wansapanataym special with Sharlene San Pedro and Jairus Aquino which entitled Si Lulu at Lily Liit.

In 2015, he starred in his big screen debut opposite to Barbie Forteza and Elisse Joson entitled #EwanKoSaU Saranghaeyo, a maindie (mainstream independent) romcom film.

Filmography

Television

Films

Awards and nominations

References

External links

Magundayao
Viva Artists Agency
Living people
People from Antipolo
Male actors from Rizal
Magundayao
1999 births
ABS-CBN personalities
GMA Network personalities